Jonah Lowe (born 9 May 1996) is a New Zealand rugby union player, who currently plays as a wing or centre for  in New Zealand's domestic National Provincial Championship competition and for the  in Super Rugby.

Early career

Lowe was born and raised in Hastings, and is a younger brother of former Māori All Blacks, Hurricanes and Hawke's Bay loose forward Karl Lowe.

Lowe initially attended St. John's College in Hastings, before moving to Auckland where he went to King's College for his final two years of high school. While there, he turned out for the college's first XV. In 2013, he helped them reach the semi-finals of Auckland's 1A Rugby Competition and finished on top of the individual 1A try-scoring ladder.

After graduating high school, Lowe headed back home to his native Hawke's Bay where he played for Clive Rugby & Sports Club in the province's club rugby competition. In February 2015, he was named in the first Under 20 team in the ' history for a game against their Blues counterparts.

Senior career

In 2015, his first year out of school, Lowe was named in the  ITM Cup squad. He made his Magpies debut against  - in the 13 jersey - on 12 September 2015. He played two more games that first season. Since then, he has cemented himself as a regular starter for the Magpies. Lowe's personal stats over the years have been excellent, including several tries and try assists each season. During the 2020 Mitre 10 Cup season, the Magpies won the Ranfurly Shield (taking it off ), were successful in three more Ranfurly Shield defences (against ,  and ), and won the Mitre 10 Cup Championship. Lowe scored two tries in the Championship Final against Northland, helping his team secure a well-deserved promotion to the Premiership division.

He trained with the Hurricanes during preseason and played for the franchise at the 2017 Brisbane Global Rugby Tens. Following that tournament, he was offered a full Hurricanes contract.

Lowe was - for the first time - named in the Hurricanes squad for the 2018 Super Rugby season. Due to an unfortunate string of injuries, as well as otherwise being given limited playing opportunities, Lowe only played four games for the Hurricanes during his years at the franchise.

At the end of 2020, Lowe moved franchises and was named in the  squad for the 2021 Super Rugby season. He played two seasons for the Chiefs in which he played 18 games and scored 7 tries.

On 23 June 2022, the  announced that Lowe had signed a three-year contract with the Dunedin-based franchise. Highlanders Head Coach Clarke Dermody mentioned: "What I like most about Jonah is the combination of pace and power that he possesses, and they are two great assets for any winger. He will strengthen our outsides and in combination with our other Jona (Nareki) will give us some more strike force out wide. I also like his work ethic, he’s a busy player that works hard with and without the ball."

International career

In 2014, Lowe was named in the New Zealand Secondary Schools team that played matches against Australian Schools and Fiji Schools.

Two years later, he was selected for the New Zealand Under-20 side that competed at the 2016 Oceania Rugby Under 20 Championship and 2016 World Rugby Under 20 Championship.

In 2017, Lowe was part of the New Zealand Provincial Barbarians team that played the opening game of the 2017 British & Irish Lions tour to New Zealand.

A year later, Lowe - who is of Ngāti Pikiao descent - was a member of the Māori All Blacks squad that toured the United States, Brazil and Chile. He made his Māori All Blacks debut on 3 November 2018 against the USA and scored a try in each of the three matches of the tour.

References

1996 births
Living people
Ngāti Pikiao people
New Zealand sportspeople of Samoan descent
People educated at King's College, Auckland
People educated at St John's College, Hastings
New Zealand rugby union players
New Zealand Māori rugby union players
Rugby union players from Hastings, New Zealand
Rugby union centres
Rugby union wings
Hawke's Bay rugby union players
Hurricanes (rugby union) players
Chiefs (rugby union) players
Māori All Blacks players
Highlanders (rugby union) players